DNA-directed RNA polymerase III subunit RPC3 is an enzyme that in humans is encoded by the POLR3C gene.

Interactions 

POLR3C has been shown to interact with GTF3C4.

Related gene problems
TAR syndrome
1q21.1 deletion syndrome
1q21.1 duplication syndrome

References

Further reading